Sir Frederick Stratten Russell  (3 November 1897 – 5 June 1984) was an English marine biologist.

Russell was born in Bridport, Dorset, and studied at Gonville and Caius College, Cambridge. From 1924 he worked for the Marine Biological Association in Plymouth, becoming its director in 1945. He was elected to the Royal Society in 1938, was awarded the Linnean Medal in 1961, and knighted in 1965. The National Marine Biological Library at the Marine Biological Association retains much of Russell's scientific and personal papers for the period 1921-1984.

Russell studied the life histories and distribution of plankton. He also discovered a means of distinguishing between different species of fish shortly after they have hatched. He was the author of The Medusae of the British Isles (1953–1970). He served in both World Wars, being awarded, among others, the Distinguished Flying Cross.

He was the father of W. M. S. Russell.

Taxon named in his honor 
 Russell’s dragonet, Callionymus russelli C. R. Johnson, 1976

References

1897 births
1984 deaths
English marine biologists
Fellows of the Royal Society
People from Bridport
Alumni of Gonville and Caius College, Cambridge
Linnean Medallists
Recipients of the Distinguished Flying Cross (United Kingdom)
Recipients of the Distinguished Service Cross (United Kingdom)
Recipients of the Croix de Guerre (France)
20th-century British zoologists